Balchik Ridge (Balchishki Rid \bal-'chish-ki 'rid\) is a 1.3 km long narrow ridge in Tangra Mountains on Livingston Island in the South Shetland Islands, Antarctica with a highest point of 550m.  The ridge adjoins the col linking Silistra Knoll and Peshev Ridge and surmounts Boyana Glacier to the southwest, south and east.  The ridge was named after the Bulgarian town of Balchik.

Location
The ridge was mapped by Bulgaria in 2005.

See also
 List of Bulgarian toponyms in Antarctica
 Antarctic Place-names Commission

Maps
 L.L. Ivanov et al. Antarctica: Livingston Island and Greenwich Island, South Shetland Islands. Scale 1:100000 topographic map. Sofia: Antarctic Place-names Commission of Bulgaria, 2005.
 L.L. Ivanov. Antarctica: Livingston Island and Greenwich, Robert, Snow and Smith Islands. Scale 1:120000 topographic map.  Troyan: Manfred Wörner Foundation, 2009.

References
 Balchik Ridge. SCAR Composite Gazetteer of Antarctica
 Bulgarian Antarctic Gazetteer. Antarctic Place-names Commission. (details in Bulgarian, basic data in English)

External links
 Balchik Ridge. Copernix satellite image

Tangra Mountains
Ridges of Antarctica
Balchik